Hince is a surname. Notable people with the surname include:

 Frank Hince (1882–1945), Australian rules footballer
 Jamie Hince (born 1968), English guitarist, singer, and songwriter
 Julienne Hince, Australian High Commissioner to Malta, appointed in 2016
 Paul Hince (born 1945), English footballer